The Hype is an American reality television series presented by Speedy Morman which showcases the best streetwear fashion designers in the country. The designers are competing for the judges' "co-sign" and a cash prize of $150,000. The series premiered on August 12, 2021, on HBO Max. The series was picked up for a second season, which premiered on September 22, 2022, with Morman returning as host, as well as all three judges from the first season.

Cast

Hosts
 Speedy Morman

Judges
 Marni Senofonte
 Beth "Bephie" Berkitt
 Offset

Guest Judges (Season 1)
 A$AP Ferg
 Alexander John
 Jim Lee
 Bobby Hundreds
 Cardi B
 Dapper Dan

Guest Judges (Season 2)
 Law Roach
 24kGoldn
 Kai Nguyen
 Angelo Baque
 Blacc Sam
 BH
 Shai Gilgeous-Alexander

Designers (Season 1)
The first season began with 9 designers. Wole joined the competition in the second episode.

Designers (Season 2)
The second season began with 12 designers, but only 9 were guaranteed spots in the competition. The judges looked at the designers' racks and ranked Alexzander, Chelsea, and Jason at the bottom. The three designers then competed to put together a look to earn the final spot in the show, which Alexzander won.

Episodes

Season 1 (2021)

Season 2 (2022)

References

External links
 HBO Max Originals | The Hype

2021 American television series debuts
2020s American reality television series
HBO Max original programming
English-language television shows
Fashion-themed reality television series
Fashion design
Television shows filmed in Los Angeles
Television shows filmed in California
Reality competition television series